Vale Royal or variation, may refer to:

 Vale Royal, Cheshire, England, UK; a former local government borough
 Vale Royal (Jamaica), official residence of the Prime Minister of Jamaica
 Vale Royal Abbey, Whitegate, Cheshire, England, UK; a former abbey and later mansion
 Abbot of Vale Royal
 Vale Royal Company, ironmongery founded by the Vale Royal Abbey
 Vale Royal Methodist Church, Royal Tunbridge Wells, Kent, England
 Warrington and Vale Royal College, Warrington, Cheshire, England, UK; a vocational college

See also

 Royal Vale School, a French-immersion English-language school in Montreal, Quebec, Canada
 Royal Vale Elementary School (1951–1980), former occupant of the Royal West Academy building in Montreal, Quebec, Canada
 Royal (disambiguation)
 Royal Gorge (disambiguation)
 Royal Valley (disambiguation)
 Vale (disambiguation)